The 1940–41 Yugoslav Hockey League season was the fifth season of the Yugoslav Hockey League. It was won by Ilirija.

Structure
The competition was divided up into divisions. The finals consisted of teams from three entities in which hockey was played in the country, Slovenia, Croatia and Serbia. There were four Croatian teams in the league, and they played against one another in the same division. The winner would thus advance on to the championship.

Results

Croatian division
Semifinals (January 12, 1941) 
Varaždin – HAŠK Zagreb 1–0,
KSU – ZKD Zagreb 0:6 p.f.
Finals (January 13, 1941)
Varaždin – ZKD Zagreb 3–2

Finals
The finals were held on 1 and 2 February. They were in round robin format.
1 February – Varaždin 7–0 Palić
2 February – Ilirija 10–0 Varaždin
2 February – Ilirija 13–1 Palić

Final standings
Ilirija Ljubljana
Varaždin
Palić

Champions
Ice Rihar, Luce Žitnik, Tone Pogačnik, Karel Pavletič, Jože Gogala, Oto Gregorič, Mirko Eržen, Viljem Morbaeher, Ernest Aljančič.

References

Yugoslav Ice Hockey League seasons
Yugoslav Hockey League Season, 1940-41
1940–41 in Yugoslav ice hockey